Pristimantis gaigei, also known as Fort Randolph robber frog or Gaige's rain frog, is a species of frog in the family Strabomantidae. It is found in the Atlantic drainage lowlands from extreme south-eastern Costa Rica to eastern Panama and to central Colombia; it is widely distributed in Colombia west of the Cordillera Oriental. Its natural habitat is primary humid lowland forest, but it also occurs in secondary forest. It is a nocturnal species found under surface debris and in leaf-litter.

Pristimantis gaigei is named after Helen Beulah Thompson Gaige, an American herpetologist.

Description
The species is considered a mimic of poison dart frogs (Dendrobatidae): it has a pair of red, orange, or golden dorsolateral stripes, resembling toxic species Phyllobates aurotaenia and Phyllobates lugubris; some populations of Pristimantis gaigeae are sympatric with these species.

Reproduction
This species has axillary amplexus. No male advertisement call has been recorded and the species is presumed to have none. Egg clutches were typically buried in the substrate or laid under cover. Hatching takes place after 28–39 days. Development is direct, and the newly hatched froglets were about 5 mm in length.

References

gaigei
Amphibians of Colombia
Amphibians of Costa Rica
Amphibians of Panama
Amphibians described in 1931
Taxa named by Emmett Reid Dunn
Taxonomy articles created by Polbot